Hokkaido Iwamizawa Higashi High School (北海道岩見沢東高等学校, Hokkaidō Iwamizawa Higashi Kōtō Gakkō) is a high school in Iwamizawa, Hokkaido, Japan, founded in 1922. Hokkaido Iwamizawa Higashi High School is one of high schools administrated by Hokkaido.

The school is operated by the Hokkaido Prefectural Board of Education.

Address
Address: Higashiyama 8-1-1, Iwamizawa, Hokkaido, Japan

External links
The Official Website of Hokkaido Iwamizawa Higashi High School

High schools in Hokkaido
Educational institutions established in 1922
1922 establishments in Japan